The Devil is a Hungarian play by Ferenc Molnár, first produced in 1907. It was adapted in 1918 for a Hungarian film directed by Michael Curtiz. James Young directed an English-language version, The Devil (1921), in which George Arliss reprised his Broadway stage success.

External links

 
 

1907 plays
Hungarian plays
Plays by Ferenc Molnár